The Yanick Dupre Memorial Award is presented annually to the American Hockey League's man of the year for service to his local community. The award winner is chosen by the league president.

The award is named after former Hershey Bears player Yanick Dupre, who died of leukemia at age 24.

Winners

References

External links
Official AHL website
AHL Hall of Fame

American Hockey League trophies and awards
Humanitarian and service awards